The 1970–71 season was the 60th season in Hajduk Split’s history and their 25th season in the Yugoslav First League. Their 7th place finish in the 1969–70 season meant it was their 25th successive season playing in the Yugoslav First League.

Competitions

Overall

Yugoslav First League

Classification

Matches

First League

Source: hajduk.hr

Yugoslav Cup

Sources: hajduk.hr

Inter-Cities Fairs Cup

Source: hajduk.hr

Player seasonal records

Top scorers

Source: Competitive matches

See also
1970–71 Yugoslav First League
1970–71 Yugoslav Cup

External sources
 1970–71 Yugoslav First League at rsssf.com
 1970–71 Yugoslav Cup at rsssf.com
 1970–71 Inter-Cities Fairs Cup at rsssf.com

HNK Hajduk Split seasons
Hajduk Split
Yugoslav football championship-winning seasons